Aliabad (also Romanized as ‘Alīābād; also known as ‘Alīābād Chūnchenān, ‘Alīābād-e Chūnchenān, Bandar-e ‘Alīābād, and Zībā Kenār) is a village in Aliabad-e Ziba Kenar Rural District, Lasht-e Nesha District, Rasht County, Gilan Province, Iran. At the 2006 census, its population was 2,050, in 604 families.

References 

Populated places in Rasht County